Dalcerides mesoa is a moth in the family Dalceridae. It was described by Herbert Druce in 1887. It is found in southern Mexico, Guatemala, Costa Rica, Panama, Colombia, Venezuela and Ecuador. The habitat consists of tropical wet, tropical moist, tropical dry, tropical premontane wet, tropical premontane rain, subtropical wet and subtropical dry forests.

The length of the forewings is 6–8 mm for males and 8–11 mm for females. The forewings are orange yellow with a large brown spot covering most of the middle of the wing. The hindwings are yellow orange. Adults are on wing year round.

The larvae feed on Paullinia bracteosa.

References

Moths described in 1887
Dalceridae
Moths of South America
Moths of Central America
Moths of North America